Beshear may refer to:
Andy Beshear, incumbent Governor of Kentucky
Lake Beshear, a lake in Kentucky
Steve Beshear, former Governor of Kentucky